Peter Leslie Carter (19 November 1956 – 2 September 2014) was a British diplomat who served as the British Deputy High Commissioner to Nigeria from 2012 until his death in 2014.  He was previously Her Britannic Majesty's Ambassador to the Republic of Estonia from 2007 until 2012.

Carter was educated at The Skinners' School in Tunbridge Wells, Kent, and attended New College, Oxford, where he studied Modern Languages. He then worked for Arthur Andersen before moving to Italy, where he became a language teacher.

In 1984, he joined HM Diplomatic Service with postings at the Foreign and Commonwealth Office in London and New Delhi, and in 1996 went to Brussels, where he became responsible for the EU's Middle East policy. He returned to London in 1998, where he negotiated the deal between North Korea and the United Kingdom which established diplomatic relations between the two countries. In 2001, Carter became Consul General at the British Embassy in Tel Aviv, Israel, and then in 2006 he served as Consul General in Milan. In December 2007 he was confirmed as the United Kingdom's Ambassador to Estonia.

Peter Carter died suddenly of a suspected heart attack on arrival at the Murtala Muhammed International Airport in Lagos, Nigeria.

See also
British High Commission, Abuja

References

Links
 CARTER, Peter Leslie, Who's Who 2013, A & C Black, 2013; online edition, Oxford University Press, Dec 2012, accessed 1 January 2013.
 Biography,  archived from the British Embassy's website; accessed 7 September 2014. 
 "Change of Her Majesty's Ambassador to the Republic of Estonia", UKinEstonia.fco.gov, 11 July 2011.

1956 births
2014 deaths
Alumni of New College, Oxford
Ambassadors of the United Kingdom to Estonia
People educated at The Skinners' School